Earth Spacedock is a fictional space station orbiting Earth in the Star Trek universe, designed originally by David Carson and Nilo Rodis of Industrial Light and Magic in the 1980s.  It is large enough to contain several starships of that fictional universe, and in real life the Spacedock consisted of a series of sets, miniatures, and designs that were used for various films and television shows in the 1980s and 1990s. Written spacedock (one word), it is first seen in the 1984 film Star Trek III: The Search for Spock, and subsequently in the fourth, fifth, and sixth Star Trek movies.

The spacedock also makes appearances in The Next Generation-era trilogy of seven season shows (The Next Generation, Deep Space Nine, and Voyager) of the 1980s and 1990s. Space stations of this class in orbit around other places are shown many times in TNG, In this era before computer generated spacecraft, models were expensive so they were often re-used to increase efficiency of the budget.

This was an advanced model in an era before computer generated images became common, and it had various neon lights and doors which could open for the special effects shots. The design contained miles/kilometers of fiberoptics for lighting.

Earth Spacedock has a cameo of sorts, shown being under construction in Earth orbit in the season one finale of Star Trek: Discovery, a show set a decade before the original Star Trek (1966–69) in its primary science fiction universe.

Concept and design
The design was to be done away with after Search for Spock, and ILM dismantled it after that film. When it was desired to be used again for the next movie, Star Trek IV, it had to be re-assembled. The re-use of the model from the previous movie and also the re-use of interior sets depicting the station helped economize on the budget for Star Trek IV: The Voyage Home, which debuted in 1986. It is one of franchise's "enduring spacecraft designs".

Appearances
Appearances:
Star Trek III (1984)
Star Trek IV (1986) (In this film the whole station gets turned off by the whale probe)
Star Trek V (1989)
Star Trek VI (1991)
Four appearances in Star Trek: The Next Generation (1987–1993 show)
Star Trek: Voyager (one episode) (1995–2001 show)
Star Trek: Discovery (one episode) (2017–Current show)

In other media
Spacedock is also featured in the 21st century Star Trek computer game Star Trek: Online. A virtual memorial to the real-life actors that played the cast of the original series was placed in Earth Spacedock in that computer game by the year 2015, including for actor Leonard Nimoy. Earth Spacedock is used as a starting point for missions in Star Trek: Online, as noted by the book Star Worlds: Freedom Versus Control in Online Gameworlds.

In the Star Trek universe, the space docks are equipped for repairing and re-supplying, or changing personnel aboard visiting spacecraft, such as the Enterprise.

The space station was designed by Industrial Light & Magic (known for Star Wars), who employed David Carson and Nilo Rodis on the project. One feature of the Spacedock design was its interior set, which included an area with large windows, outside which the Enterprise could be seen, thus allowing the Enterprise to be seen in scale compared to people, all inside the Spacedock space station.

Spacedock has also been used as a plot device in Star Trek franchise novels, such as in The Star Trek: The Original Series: The Case of the Colonist's Corpse by Tony Isabella, Bob Ingersoll in which a starship returns to spacedock for repairs.

Earth Spacedock is the starting point for Picard's Next Generation Enterprise journey in that series. In that narrative, the Enterprise-D leaves Earth Spacedock in the year 2364 to travel to the planet Deneb IV, where it will pick up crew including Commander Riker and host an inspection by McCoy from the original series, now a Federation Admiral. Enterprise-D was the third Galaxy class starship to leave Spacedock, the previous two were the Galaxy and the Yamato in 2357 and 2363 respectively. The Yamato is Enterprise-D sister ship, but is destroyed in the TNG episode "Contagion" (S2E11), which debuted in March 1989.

The space station is often noted in encyclopedias of Star Trek Universe lore, which note the station's name as Spacedock written as one word.

See also
Deep Space Nine (fictional space station) (the other major fictional space station of Star Trek and setting for the 1990s sci-fi show Deep Space Nine)
Space dock

References

Citations

External links

Designing Earth Spacedock
Memory Alpha database image showing the Federation space station Spacedock, with Enterprise on departure
Additional information

Fictional elements introduced in 1984
Fictional space stations
Star Trek locations
Star Trek spacecraft